The 2009 World U-17 Hockey Challenge was an international ice hockey tournament held in Campbell River, Courtenay, Duncan, Nanaimo, Parksville, and Port Alberni, British Columbia, Canada between December 29, 2008 and January 4, 2009. The venues used for the tournament included the Strathcona Gardens in Campbell River, the Comox Valley Sports Center in Courtenay, the Cowichan Valley Arena in Duncan, the Frank Crane Arena in Nanaimo, Oceanside Place in Parksville, and the Alberni Valley Multiplex in Port Alberni.  Canada Ontario defeated Canada Pacific in the final to capture the gold medal for the second consecutive year, while the United States defeated Canada West to earn the bronze.

Challenge results

Preliminary round

Group A

Group B

Final round

Final standings

Tournament All-Star Team
Goaltender:  Ontario J. P. Anderson
Defencemen:  Adam Clendening,  Atlantic Brandon Gormley
Forwards:  Ontario John McFarland,  Quebec Guillaume Asselin,  Brandon Saad

References

External links
Official website

See also
 2009 World Junior Ice Hockey Championships
 2009 IIHF World U18 Championships

2009
U-17
U-17
U-17
U-17
U-17
U-17
Campbell River, British Columbia
Courtenay, British Columbia
Duncan, British Columbia
Parksville, British Columbia
Port Alberni
Sport in Nanaimo
Ice hockey in British Columbia
International ice hockey competitions hosted by Canada